Wenas Wildlife Area is a  protected area managed by the Washington Department of Fish and Wildlife located in Yakima and Kittitas counties. The property was acquired in the mid-1960s to provide wintering grounds for the Yakima elk herd and is managed with the chief purpose of providing healthy wildlife habitat.

References

External links

Wenas Wildlife Area Washington Department of Fish and Wildlife

Nature reserves in Washington (state)
Protected areas of Kittitas County, Washington
Protected areas of Yakima County, Washington